Maradi may refer to:
 Maradi Region, Niger
 Maradi, Niger
 Roman Catholic Diocese of Maradi
 Maradi Airport